Educational institutions in Nizamabad include primary, secondary and university level systems. Nizamabad is a major urban center and the third largest city in Telangana.

The area hosts 727 high schools. It has nine private engineering colleges and a state university as well as a government medical A total of 143 junior colleges, of which 31 are administered by the Telangana Government are present. The district has undergraduate degree-granting (3-year Bachelors) and post-graduate colleges. Telangana University has 149 college affiliations, 86 of which are in Nizamabad and 63 in Adilabad.

Universities
 Telangana University
 Rajiv Gandhi University of Knowledge Technologies (referred as IIIT Basar)

Private engineering colleges

Medical colleges 
 Government Medical College
 Christian Medical College
 Meghna Institute of Dental Sciences (MIDS)
 Tirumala College of Nursing
 Vishal Paramedical Institute
 Government ITI College

Private pharmacy colleges 
 Ganga Pharmacy college
 Tirumala Pharmacy college
 Vijay Pharmacy college

Education colleges
 Kakatiya B.Ed. College
 Indur College of Education
 Vijay College of Education
 Katipally Ravinder Reddy College of Education
 St Thomas College of Education
 Priyadarshini College of Education
 Sri Chaitanya College of Education
 S.S.B.S B.Ed. College
 Pragathi College of Education
 Azaan College of Education
 University College of Education

UG & PG Degree colleges 
Colleges affiliated with Telangana University:

Undergraduate
 Gautami Degree College (Telangana University)
 Girraj Government College (Autonomous)
 Government Degree Colleges
 Nalanda Degree College for Women
 MSR Degree College
 Nishitha Degree & PG College
 Women's College
 Care Degree College
 CSI Degree College
 Government Arts and Science College
 SSR Degree College
 Pragathi Degree College
 Adarsha Hindi Maha Vidyalaya
 Gnyana Saraswathi Degree College
 Vijay Institute of Management
 Kshatriya Degree College
 Vaagdevi Degree College
 Nishitha Commerce And Science College

Post-Graduate
 Girraj Govt. College (Autonomous)
 Nishitha PG College (Osmania University)
 Nishitha College of Arts & Management
 Telangana University College of Law
 Government PG Colleges
 S.S.R. Degree College
 Women's Degree College
 University College, Main Campus
 University College, South Campus
 Gauthami PG College
 Indur College of Management
 St. Thomas College of Management
 Gnyana Saraswathi College of Management
 Vijetha Degree & PG College
 Vijay Degree & PG College
 Vashista Degree & PG College
 SRNK Govt. Degree College
 Siddhartha Degree College

Intermediate colleges 
 Kakatiya Junior College

 Shaankary Junior College 
 Nirmala Hrudaya College for Girls
 Government Jr College for Boys
 Vagdevi Jr College
 Government Jr College for Girls
 CSI Junior College
 Goutami Jr College
 Vishwashanti Junior College
 Golden Jubilee Jr College
 Crescent Jr College for Girls
 Narayana Jr College
 Kakatiya Mahila College
 Anwar-Ul-Uloom College
 Vijay Jr College
 Women's Junior College
 MSR Jr College
 Saraswati Jr College
 Vani Vocational Junior College 
 A.P.R.Jr.College (Urdu) for Boys

High schools
 Raghava high school
 Sacred Heart Academy
 Kakatiya High School
 Crescent High School u/m & e/m
 Nirmala Hrudaya School for Girls
 Vishwa Vikas High School (VVHS)
 Vasudha High School. Dubba
 Vijay High School
 Navya Bharati Global School (NGS)(CBSE)
 St Francis De Sales’ High School (SFS)
 Goutam Model High School (GMS)
 Golden Jubilee High School (u/m & e/m)
 Knowledge Park International School (CBSE(ICSE)
 National High School (u/m)
 Noble High School
 Nilofar High School
 MSR High School
 St Theresa School
 RBVRR High School
 SSR Discovery Academy (CBSE)
 Wood Bridge
 Modern High School
 Sunflower High School
 Blooming Buds High School (CBSE)
 Martinet High School
 St Xavier's High School
 Presidency High School
 Public High School (u/m)
 Vasavi Spaes School (CBSE)
 Vignan High School
 Orchid High School
 Victory High School

See also 
 List of educational institutions in Telangana
  List of educational institutions in Nanded (India)

References 

 Ed